David Alan Hornsby (born December 1, 1975) is an American actor, screenwriter, and producer. He is best known for a recurring role as defrocked priest Matthew "Rickety Cricket" Mara on the FX comedy series It's Always Sunny in Philadelphia, for which he also writes and co-produces. Hornsby also had a regular role on the NBC comedy-crime series Good Girls (2018–2020). He is also the voice of Fanboy in the Nickelodeon animated TV series Fanboy & Chum Chum.

Early life
Hornsby was born in Newport News, Virginia, on December 1, 1975. He is a cousin of musician Bruce Hornsby. He grew up in Houston, Texas, and majored in acting at Carnegie Mellon University.

Career
Hornsby plays defrocked priest Matthew "Rickety Cricket" Mara on the FX comedy series It's Always Sunny in Philadelphia, also serving as an executive producer and writer on the show. He appeared as Steve "The Hutch" Hutchinson on The Joe Schmo Show, and as Patrick on Six Feet Under. His first animated role was Fanboy in Fanboy & Chum Chum. He also starred in the independent film Pretty Bird.

Hornsby appeared in Pearl Harbor, Minority Report, and Flags of Our Fathers (in which he played USMC photographer Louis R. Lowery). He created and performed in the podcast Yoda and Me along with Loren Tarquinio. He adapted and created the CBS sitcom How to Be a Gentleman, serving as its lead actor, writer, and producer; CBS canceled the series in its first season. Hornsby co-wrote, designed characters, and lent his voice to FX's cartoon Unsupervised, which lasted for one season. Most recently, he created the NBC pilot for Mission Control, produced by Gary Sanchez Productions for NBC a workplace sitcom set at NASA's Johnson Space Center circa 1965.

Hornsby portrays executive producer David Brittlesbee in Mythic Quest, a comedy web television series starring Rob McElhenney for Apple TV+. Hornsby also served as a writer and executive producer for the show which premiered on February 7, 2020.

Personal life
On September 25, 2010, Hornsby married actress Emily Deschanel in Pacific Palisades, California. They have two sons together: Henry Lamar (born September 21, 2011) and Calvin (born June 8, 2015).

Filmography

Film

Television

Video games

Web

References

External links
 

1975 births
Living people
American male film actors
American male television actors
Television producers from Texas
American television writers
American male voice actors
Carnegie Mellon University College of Fine Arts alumni
Male actors from Houston
American male television writers
The Kinkaid School alumni
Screenwriters from Texas